Héctor Alfredo Moreno Herrera (born 17 January 1988) is a Mexican professional footballer who plays as a centre-back for Liga MX club Monterrey and the Mexico national team.

Moreno ascended the youth ranks of Club Universidad Nacional, making his senior debut in 2006 at the age of 18. He moved abroad a year later, joining Dutch side AZ Alkmaar, with whom he won his first league title. He joined Spanish side Espanyol in 2011, playing with the side for four years before returning to the Netherlands with PSV Eindhoven. In 2017, Moreno had a short spell with Roma before moving back to Spain with Real Sociedad.

Moreno was a member of the Mexico national under-17 team that won the 2005 World Championship held in Peru. He has also represented Mexico at the 2010, 2014, 2018, and 2022 FIFA World Cup, as well as the 2011 and 2019 CONCACAF Gold Cup, the Copa América Centenario, and the 2013 and 2017 FIFA Confederations Cup.

Club career

Club Universidad Nacional
Héctor Moreno joined Club Universidad Nacional's youth system in 2003 at age 15, and made his way into the first team after winning the FIFA U-17 World Championship with Mexico in 2005.

Moreno made his professional debut during the Clausura 2006 tournament, coming on as an 88th-minute substitute for Gerardo Galindo in the 1–0 victory over Santos Laguna on 22 January. He played his first full 90 minutes on 12 February in a 2–0 win over Veracruz, and scored his first goal the following week in a 1–3 defeat to Cruz Azul. Moreno would end the Clausura making six appearances in total. He would eventually secure his position as a regular starter.

For the Apertura 2007, Moreno would play in his first, and only, league final with UNAM, losing to Atlante 2–1 on aggregate.

AZ
On 13 December 2007, it was announced Moreno was transferred to Dutch club AZ in a US$4.5 million deal. He made his Eredivisie debut on 1 March 2008 in a 1–1 draw against Roda JC, playing the full 90 minutes. In April 2009, Moreno won his first Eredivisie title with AZ. On 22 April, it was reported Moreno had signed a contract extension with AZ which would tie him to the club until 2014.

On 25 July, AZ won the Johan Cruyff Shield after defeating Heerenvecen 5–1 in the final. Moreno made his debut in the UEFA Champions League on 16 September in a 0–1 defeat to Olympiacos. On 7 February 2010, Moreno gave Alkmaar a 2–1 victory over Feyenoord by scoring a header from a corner-kick in the 87th minute. He scored his third goal of the season in a 6–2 victory over RKC Waalwijk on 13 March 2010. He would score his fourth goal in a 3–0 victory over Willem II on 18 April.

Espanyol
On 22 June 2011, it was announced Moreno would transfer to Spanish La Liga club Espanyol on a five-year contract for an undisclosed fee. On 28 August, he made his debut in La Liga against Mallorca. On 26 September, he scored his first goal in a 1–3 loss to Levante. On 3 December, he would score his second league goal in a 1–2 loss to Valencia. Moreno scored his third goal of the season in a 3–1 home win against Racing de Santander.

On 4 October 2012, Moreno was named Espanyol's Player of the Year for the 2011–12 season, his debut season, playing 35 league matches (for a total of 3,295 minutes played) and scoring three goals with one assist.

Prior to the start of the 2014–15 season, it was announced Moreno would be out of action for up to six months due to a broken left tibia he suffered while playing for Mexico at the 2014 FIFA World Cup, which would require surgery and rehabilitation. It was rumoured the injury prevented him from signing for Manchester United during the summer transfer window. Moreno made his return after four months on 14 November in a friendly against Marseille, replacing Felipe Caicedo in the 68th minute in an eventual 2–1 win.

Moreno made his official return with Espanyol on 2 December, coming off the bench to replace Álvaro in the 73rd minute in the 2–0 victory over Alavés in the first leg of the round of 32 of the Copa del Rey.

PSV
On 15 August 2015, PSV Eindhoven announced the signing of Moreno. Upon his return to the Eredivisie, Moreno signed a four-year contract for €5 million with the club.

Moreno was handed a starting berth on his debut and played all 90 minutes in the 6–0 win over Cambuur on 12 September. Three days later, during PSV's opening 2015–16 UEFA Champions League match against Manchester United, Moreno broke the leg of Luke Shaw as the result of a two-footed challenge. He was not sanctioned for the tackle on Shaw, and Moreno went on to score the 47th-minute equaliser for PSV as they defeated Manchester United 2–1 in the match. He was later named UEFA Man of the Match.

On 17 January 2016, Moreno scored in PSV's 2–0 win over Feyenoord. A week later, he scored his first double as PSV defeated Twente 4–2 with assists provided by fellow Mexico national teammate, Andrés Guardado.

On 8 May, Moreno played all 90 minutes in PSV's defeat of PEC Zwolle 3–1 on the final matchday to be crowned 2015–16 Eredivisie champions.

On 31 July, PSV won the 2016 Johan Cruyff Shield but Moreno was not present on the field or bench.

The following season, Moreno played in 39 matches across all competitions, and scored seven goals, a career-high tally, though PSV failed to defend the league as they finished in third place.

Roma
On 13 June 2017, Moreno joined Italian side Roma on a four-year contract. He made his Serie A debut on 16 September in Roma's 3–0 win over Hellas Verona, replacing Kostas Manolas in the 73rd minute.

Real Sociedad

On 31 January 2018, Spanish club Real Sociedad announced the transfer of Moreno from Roma for €6 million, signing with the club until 2021. On 15 February, he made his competitive debut for La Real against Red Bull Salzburg in the Europa League, playing 76 minutes in the team's 2–2 draw. During midweek training, however, Moreno suffered a grade 1 injury to his internal obturator, meaning he would be ruled out for an undisclosed period of time. He returned and made his debut in La Liga with Real Sociedad on 1 March in a scoreless draw against Real Betis. Three days later, he scored his first goal against Deportivo Alavés, giving his team the lead at the 6th minute, in an eventual 2–1 victory.

Al-Gharafa
He transferred to Al-Gharafa in July 2019, making him the first Mexican international player to play in Qatar Stars League. He made his debut the following month on 22 August in a 3–0 victory over Al-Shahania. On 9 November, he would score his first goal for the team in a 2–0 victory over Umm Salal SC.

Monterrey
On 7 June 2021, Moreno joined Monterrey as free agent.

International career

Youth
Moreno was called up to participate at the 2005 FIFA U-17 World Cup in Peru. Mexico would go on to win the tournament, beating Brazil in the final 3–0.

Moreno participated at the 2006 Toulon Tournament, where Mexico finished third in the group stage.

During Mexico's first match at the 2007 FIFA U-20 World Cup against Gambia, Moreno played as a defensive midfielder and scored Mexico's third goal in a 3–0 victory. Mexico would win their group but would be eliminated in the quarter-finals by Argentina.

Senior
Moreno made his senior national team debut on 17 October 2007 under Hugo Sánchez in a friendly against Guatemala.

Moreno was included by Javier Aguirre to be a part of the 23-man squad that would participate in the 2010 FIFA World Cup. He made his debut in the Group A match against France on 17 June, which Mexico won 2–0. Moreno would also start against Uruguay.

Moreno was called up by José Manuel de la Torre to be part of the national team that won the 2011 CONCACAF Gold Cup. He played in all of Mexico's matches, as well as the final against the United States, which Mexico won 4–2.

On 12 June 2012, Moreno scored the winning goal for Mexico in a 2–1 game over El Salvador in a 2014 World Cup qualifying match, the first of his career.

He was called up for the 2013 FIFA Confederations Cup. He appeared in every match as Mexico finished 3rd in the group stage.

On 5 June 2014, national team coach Miguel Herrera named Moreno in the final 23-man squad for the 2014 World Cup. On 29 June, in the round of 16 match against the Netherlands, Moreno suffered a fractured tibia after a collision with Dutch striker Arjen Robben inside his own penalty area. Moreno was stretchered off the field a few minutes before half-time and was substituted by Diego Reyes. It was later reported Moreno was expected to be ruled out of action for up to six months.

On 27 June 2015, during Mexico's friendly match against Costa Rica, Moreno was substituted off at half-time after complaining of pain. On 1 July, the Mexican Football Federation announced Moreno would be ruled out of the upcoming 2015 CONCACAF Gold Cup tournament after a successful surgery on his right foot, which stemmed from complications related to a procedure he underwent six years prior following an injury to his fifth metatarsal. He was replaced in the squad by Oswaldo Alanís. As Mexico won the tournament, he was called up by interim manager Ricardo Ferretti to participate in the subsequent CONCACAF Cup – a play-off match to determine CONCACAF's entry into the 2017 FIFA Confederations Cup – against the United States. Mexico won the match 3–2 during overtime.

In May 2016, he was called up for the Copa América Centenario by Juan Carlos Osorio.

He was called up for the 2017 FIFA Confederations Cup. He would score the late equalizer in the 2–2 group-stage draw against Portugal. He would go on to appear all five matches of the tournament.

In May 2018, Moreno was named in Mexico's preliminary 28-man squad for the World Cup, and in June, was ultimately included in the final 23-man roster. He would appear in all group stage matches but accumulated two yellow cards during the group stage, making him miss out on the round-of-16 0–2 loss against Brazil.

On 6 June 2019, Moreno was called up by coach Gerardo Martino to participate in the CONCACAF Gold Cup. Three days later, in a warm-up match against Ecuador, he would pick up an injury following a clearance. He would return to the field on 29 June in the quarter-final match against Costa Rica, coming in as an overtime substitute at the 106th minute and managing to score in the penalty shoot-out. On 2 July, Moreno played his 100th match with Mexico against Haiti, in a 1–0 win in the semi-finals of the Gold Cup. The team would go on to win the tournament, defeating the United States 1–0 in the final.

As Tri captain Andrés Guardado withdrew from the 2021 Gold Cup roster due to injury, Moreno was expected to wear the captain armband, but did not appear until the final group stage match due to being unfit. In the final against the United States, Moreno withdrew during the first half of the match due to injury, being replaced by Carlos Salcedo. Mexico lost the match 1–0.

In October 2022, Moreno was named in Mexico's preliminary 31-man squad for the World Cup, and in November, was ultimately included in the final 26-man roster.

Style of play
Moreno is a left-footed defender who is capable of starting attacks from the back and "with excellent passing that characterizes the modern center back." Writing for Bleacher Report, Allan Jiang described him as being able to "read and quickly react in adverse situations", as well as having positional awareness. He described Moreno's playing style as retaining the dominant defensive position, jockeying and forcing the opposing player into a mistake.

Career statistics

Club

International

Scores and results list Mexico's goal tally first, score column indicates score after each Moreno goal.

Honours
AZ
Eredivisie: 2008–09
Johan Cruyff Shield: 2009

PSV
Eredivisie: 2015–16
Johan Cruyff Shield: 2016

Monterrey
CONCACAF Champions League: 2021

Mexico U17
FIFA U-17 World Championship: 2005

Mexico
CONCACAF Gold Cup: 2011, 2019
CONCACAF Cup: 2015

Individual
CONCACAF Best XI: 2015, 2017, 2021
IFFHS CONCACAF Men's Team of the Decade: 2011–2020

See also
 List of footballers with 100 or more caps

References

External links

Espanyol official profile

1988 births
Living people
Mexican footballers
Sportspeople from Culiacán
Footballers from Sinaloa
Association football defenders
Liga MX players
Club Universidad Nacional footballers
Eredivisie players
AZ Alkmaar players
PSV Eindhoven players
La Liga players
RCD Espanyol footballers
Serie A players
A.S. Roma players
Real Sociedad footballers
Qatar Stars League players
Al-Gharafa SC players
Mexico international footballers
Mexican expatriate footballers
Expatriate footballers in the Netherlands
Expatriate footballers in Spain
Expatriate footballers in Italy
Expatriate footballers in Qatar
Mexico under-20 international footballers
Mexico youth international footballers
Mexican expatriate sportspeople in the Netherlands
Mexican expatriate sportspeople in Spain
Mexican expatriate sportspeople in Italy
Mexican expatriate sportspeople in Qatar
2010 FIFA World Cup players
2011 CONCACAF Gold Cup players
2013 FIFA Confederations Cup players
2014 FIFA World Cup players
Copa América Centenario players
2017 FIFA Confederations Cup players
2018 FIFA World Cup players
2019 CONCACAF Gold Cup players
2021 CONCACAF Gold Cup players
2022 FIFA World Cup players
CONCACAF Gold Cup-winning players
FIFA Century Club